WTKB-FM (93.7 FM, "Victory 93.7") is a radio station broadcasting a contemporary Christian music format. Licensed to Atwood, Tennessee, United States, the station is currently owned by Solid Rock Broadcasting, LLC.

References

External links
 

TKB-FM
Carroll County, Tennessee
Radio stations established in 1989